The Gulf Star Conference was an NCAA Division II conference that existed from 1984–85 to 1986–87, three academic years.  All of the schools subsequently joined the Southland Conference.  Dave Waples was the only Commissioner, with the Conference office located in Lake Charles, Louisiana.

Aftermath
Although the Southland eventually took in all of the former Gulf Star schools, only four (Northwestern State, Sam Houston State, Stephen F. Austin, and Southwest Texas State) joined the Southland immediately upon the Gulf Star's demise. The other two Gulf Star members, Nicholls State and Southeastern Louisiana, initially became independents. Nicholls State joined the SLC for the 1991–92 school year. SLU became a member of the Trans America Athletic Conference (now known as the Atlantic Sun Conference) in that same year, and moved to the Southland in 1997–98. To date, only Nicholls State, Northwestern State, and Southeastern Louisiana remain in the Southland Conference, as Southwest Texas State (now known as Texas State) joined the Sun Belt Conference in 2013 while Sam Houston State and Stephen F. Austin moved to the Western Athletic Conference in 2021.

Member schools

Final members

Notes

Membership timeline

Championships

Baseball

Football

Men's basketball

References

 
1984 establishments in the United States
1987 disestablishments in the United States